Melite may refer to:

Melite (ancient city), an ancient Punic-Roman city located on Malta, or a Greco-Roman reference to the island on which the city was located
Melite (Attica), one of the demes of ancient Attica
Melite, ancient name of Lake Trichonida in Greece
Melite (Greek mythology)
Melite (heroine)
Melite (naiad)

See also
Mélite, a 1629 play by Pierre Corneille